Knitting abbreviations are often used for brevity in describing knitting patterns.

Each knitting pattern typically provides its own abbreviations or refers to a standard. There is no single authoritative source for knitting abbreviations, so multiple standards exist.

Types of knitting abbreviations
Knitting abbreviations can be grouped by what they describe:

 side of work
RS and WS signify the "right side" and "wrong side" of the work.

 type of stitch
k means a knit stitch (passing through the previous loop from below) and p means a  purl stitch (passing through the previous loop from above).  Thus, "k2, p2", means "knit two stitches, purl two stitches". Similarly, sl st describes a slip stitch, whereas yarn-overs are denoted with yo.

 scope of stitch
The modifier tog indicates that the stitches should be knitted together, e.g., "k2tog" indicates that two stitches should be knitted together as though they were one stitch.  psso means "pass the slipped stitch over".  pnso means "pass the next stitch over".

 orientation of stitch
The modifier tbl indicates that stitches should be knitted through the back loop.  For example, "p2tog tbl" indicates that two stitches should be purled together through the back loop.  kwise and pwise connote "knitwise" and "purlwise", usually referring to a slip stitch.

 insertion point of stitch
k-b and k1b mean "knit into the row below".  Similarly, p-b and p1b mean "purl into the row below".
p tbl; P1 tbl; or P1b: Purl through the back loop.

 short combinations of stitches
MB means "make bobble".  ssk means "slip, slip, knit", i.e., the decrease "slip two stitches knitwise individually, then knit them together through the back loop".  skp is another decrease, meaning "slip, knit, pass the slipped stitch over the just knitted stitch".  (Both of these decreases are similar to the simpler "k2tog tbl", however this does result in both stitches being twisted to the left).

 repetition of stitches
Patterns of stitches that should be repeated for as many stitches as possible are enclosed in asterisks *...*.  For example, "*k2,p2*" means "repeatedly knit two stitches, purl two stitches as long as possible, i.e., until there are fewer than four stitches left in the row".  alt stands for "alternately".

 position of yarn
 wyib and wyif mean "with yarn in back" and "with yarn in front", respectively.  Used primarily with slipped stitches.

 beginnings and endings
CO and BO mean "cast on" and "bind off", respectively.

 overall pattern
St st, rev St st and g st signify "stockinette stitch", "reverse stockinette stitch" and " garter stitch", respectively.

 cable instructions
LT and RT signify "left twist" and "right twist", respectively. FC and LC indicate "front cross" or "left cross" (the same thing), whereas BC and RC indicate "back cross" or "right cross" (again the same thing).

 color changes
 MC means "main color"; CC means "contrasting color".

 decreases
k2tog indicates two stitches should be knitted together as one, used for making decreases in a row.

 increases
m1 means "make one stitch".  kfb or pfb means "knit or purl into the front and back of a stitch".

 positional abbreviations
rem means "remaining".  foll means "following".  beg means "beginning".  cont means "continue".  incl means "including".

List of knitting abbreviations
( ): work instructions between parentheses, in the place directed
[ ]: work instructions between brackets, as many times as directed
 * : repeat instructions following the single asterisk as directed 
 * * : repeat instructions between the asterisks as directed
alt: Alternate.
approx: Approximately.
BC: Back cross.
beg: Beginning.
bet: Between.
BO: Bind off.
Brk: Brioche knit.
Brp: Brioche purl.
CA: Colour A.
CB: Colour B.
CC: Contrasting colour.
cdd: Centre double decrease. Slip 2 stitches together, knit one stitch, pass the slipped stitches over (together).
cddp: Centre double decrease purl
cdi: center double increase
ch: Chain using crochet hook.
cn: Cable needle.
CO: Cast on.
cont: Continue.
C 2 L: Cross two stitches to the left.
C 2 R: Cross two stitches to the right.
C2PL: Cross two, purl left.
C2PR: Cross two, purl right.
dec(s): Decreases.
DK: Double knitting weight yarn.
dpn (or dp): Double pointed needles.
EON: End of needle.
EOR: End of row.
FC: Front cross.
fl: Front loops.
foll: Following.
g (or gr): Gramme.
grp(s): Groups.
g st: Garter stitch, knit every row.
incl: Including.
inc(s): Increases.
hk: Hook.
k: Knit.
K1b: Knit one through the back loop.
k1 f&b (or kfb): Knit one stitch in the front, then another through the back. Also known as a Bar Increase.
K1 tbl: Knit one through the back loop.
k2tog: Knit two stitches together.
k2tog tbl: Knit two stitches together, through the back loop.
k3tog : Knit three stitches together
k-b: Knit through the back loop, or knit below
k tbl: Knit one through the back loop.
kfb: Knit into the front and back of a stitch, an increase.
kll: Knit left loop; an increase.
krl: Knit right loop; an increase.
k-wise: Knit wise.
KYOK: Knit, yarn over, knit, a double increase
LC: Left cross (in knitting cables).
LH: Left hand.
lp(s): Loop(s).
LT: Left twist, to cross stitches and twist two strands of yarn.
M1: Make one stitch, an increase.
M1A: Make one away, an increase.
M1B: Make one back, an increase.
M1F: Make one front, an increase.
M1L: Make one left, an increase.
M1R: Make one right, an increase.
M1T: Make one towards, an increase.
MB: Make bobble.
MB#2: Make bobble number 2.
MC: Main colour.
MDS: Make double stitch, a short row technique
mm: Millimetre.
no: Number.
oz: Ounces.
p: Purl.
p1 f&b: Purl into the front and back of a stitch, an increase (also called pfb)
p2tog: Purl two stitches together.
p2tog tbl: Purl two together through the back loops.
pat(s) (or patt(s)): Patterns.
pfb: Purl into the front and back of a stitch, an increase.
pm: Place marker. I 
pnso: Pass next stitch over.
pop: Popcorn stitch.
prev: Previous.
psso: Pass slipped stitch over (as in slip 1, knit 1, then pass the slipped stitch over the knit stitch)
pu: Pick up stitches.
p-wise: Purl-wise.
RC: Right cross (as in: cross 2 R).
rem: Remaining.
rep: Repeats.
rev St st: Reverse stocking (stockinette) stitch.
RH: Right hand.
Rib: Ribbing.
rnd(s): Round(s). In circular knitting, rows are called "rounds".
RS: Right side, meaning the right side of the fabric (the side meant to be shown on the outside).
RT: Right twist, to twist two strands of yarn and cross stitches.
sb: Slip back one stitch (to the left needle after knitting it)
sk: Skip.
sk2p: Slip1, knit 2 tog, pass slipped stitch over (a double decrease).
SKP (or skpo): Slip, knit, pass slipped stitch over the knit stitch (the same as sl1, k1, psso).
sl (or s): Slip a stitch.
sl st: Slip stitches.
sp(s): Space(s).
ss: Slip stitch(es), Canada.
ssk: Slip a stitch, slip the next stitch, knit the slipped stitches together; a decrease.
ssk (improved): slip one stitch, slip the next stitch purl-wise, knit slipped stitches together.
ssp: Slip a stitch, slip the next stitch, purl. A decrease.
sssk: Slip, slip, slip, knit 3 slipped stitches together. A double decrease.
st(s): Stitch(es)
St st: Stocking (stockinette) stitch.
T2L: Twist two to the left.
T2R: Twist two to the right.
tbl: Through the back loop.
TM: knit to marker
tog: Together.
won: Wool over needle.
wrn: Wool around needle.
WS: Wrong side, or reverse side, meaning the side of the fabric meant to be worn on the inside.
wyib: With yarn in back.
wyif: With yarn in front.
yb (or ybk): Yarn back.
yd(s): Yards.
yfon: Yarn forward and over needle.
yfrn: Yarn forward and around needle. 
yfwd (or yf): Yarn forward.
yo: Yarn over and wrap the yarn around the right needle.

References

  (2003) Reader's Digest The Ultimate Sourcebook of Knitting and Crochet Stitches, Collins & Brown. pp. 30–1. .
 (2002) Vogue Knitting: The Ultimate Knitting Book, updated ed., Sixth and Spring Books. 
 (1979) Reader's Digest Complete Guide to Needlework, Reader's Digest Association.  
 nimble-needles.com, Knitting glossary with terms and abbreviations
 knittingfool.com, Knitting abbreviations, database-driven collection of knitting abbreviations.
 knittinghelp.com, official Website, Knitting Abbreviations Glossary
allfreeknitting.com, Common Knitting Abbreviations

External links 
 Knitting Acronyms and Abbreviations

Knitting